Corbitella elegans is a species of glass sponges (Hexactinellids) belonging to the family Euplectellidae. It is found in the Banda Sea  in the Maluku Islands of Indonesia.

The type specimen is number ZMA 01039, found in Indonesia (Maluku).

References

External links 

 
 

Hexactinellida
Animals described in 1875
Fauna of Indonesia